Eternal Love may refer to:

Songs 
"Eternal Love" (JLS song), 2021
"Eternal Love" (PJ & Duncan song), 1994
"Eternal Love" by Whitney Houston from Paul Jabara & Friends
"Eternal Love" by Stephanie Mills from Merciless

Films 
Eternal Love (1917 film), silent film directed by Douglas Gerrard
Eternal Love (1929 film), silent film directed by Ernst Lubitsch starring John Barrymore
The Love Eterne, 1963 Hong Kong film

TV Shows 
Eternal Love (TV series), a 2017 Chinese television series produced by Dragon TV based on the novel To the Sky Kingdom by Tang Qi
The Eternal Love, a 2017 Chinese television series produced by Tencent Video based on the novel Bao Xiao Chong Fei: Ye Wo Deng Ni Xiu Qi by Fan Que

Other uses 
"Kärleken är" ("Love is", English title: "Eternal Love")

See also
Love Eternal (disambiguation)